Academia de Fotbal Măgura Cisnădie, commonly known as Măgura Cisnădie or simply as Măgura, is a Romanian football club based in Cisnădie, Sibiu County, currently playing in the Liga III. Măgura Cisnădie was originally founded in 1969, under the name of Textila Cisnădie, then re-founded in 2005 as FC Cisnădie, then finally in 2013, the club was re-established for the third time, under the current name, Măgura Cisnădie.

History
Măgura Cisnădie was established for the first time in 1969, under the name of Textila Cisnădie. In the 1971–72 season, Textila won the Sibiu County Championship, but lost the promotion play-off against ICIM Brașov (1–3 at Cisnădie and 1–4 at Brașov). Then, in the summer of 1972, after missing the promotion to Divizia B, Independența Sibiu was moved to Cisnădie and merge with Textila to formed Independența Cisnădie, finishing the 1972–73 season on the 5th place.

In the summer of 1973, the club returns to the name of Textila, managing in the 1973–74 season, to finish the championship on the 2nd place, losing the promotion in front of CSU Brașov to the goal difference. For the next 32 years was a constant presence at the level of the third tier, but also with some relegations in the county leagues. The constancy of Textila was given by the owner of the club, which was the Textile Factory from Cisnădie, the biggest producer of carpets from Eastern Europe.

After the 1989 Romanian Revolution and the fall of communism, the factory, as well as the club, had more and more financial problems, finally, in the beginning of the 2000s, the Textile Factory and the football club went in bankruptcy, inevitable. Textila Cisnădie was re-established in 2005, as FC Cisnădie and between 2007 and 2012 played again in the third tier, then the effects of the financial crisis of 2007–2008 arrived at the club, and FC withdrew from the championship, to the disappointment to the fans.

The club reappeared again, after one season of break, this time under the name of Măgura Cisnădie and in 2015 promoted back to Liga III, the place were the team obtained its biggest achievements. Financial trouble hit again the club, and after only one season "the Textile workers" withdrew again, but this time enrolled in the fourth tier. After some seasons in the county leagues, Măgura gathered his strength and promoted again, at the end of the 2019–20 season. The club was ranked 2nd at the end of the next season (the best result ever) and qualified for the Liga II promotion play-offs.

Ground

Măgura Cisnădie plays its home matches on Măgura Stadium in Cisnădie, Sibiu County, with a capacity of 5,000 seats. The stadium was also known in  the past under the name of Textila Stadium. It was renovated several times, most recently during the 2010s.

Honours
Liga III:
Runners-up (2): 1973–74, 2020–21

Liga IV – Sibiu County:
Winners (10): 1971–72, 1979–80, 1986–87, 1991–92, 1992–93, 2001–02, 2006–07, 2013–14, 2014–15, 2019–20
Runners-up (1): 2018–19

Cupa României – Sibiu County:
Winners (1): 2018–19

Club officials

Board of directors

Current technical staff

League history

References

External links
 
 CS Măgura Cisnădie on frf-ajf.ro

Association football clubs established in 1969
Football clubs in Sibiu County
Liga III clubs
Liga IV clubs
1969 establishments in Romania